St Luke's Church of England School is a co-educational secondary school located in Exeter in the English county of Devon. It is a Church of England school under the jurisdiction of the Diocese of Exeter.

It was originally known as St Luke's Church of England High School, but when the school gained specialisms in science and sports it was renamed St Luke's Science and Sports College. In February 2020 St Luke's Science and Sports College converted from being a voluntary controlled school administered by Devon County Council to being an academy sponsored by The Ted Wragg Multi Academy Trust. It was then renamed St Luke's Church of England School.

St Luke's Church of England School offers GCSEs and BTECs as programmes of study for pupils.

References

External links
St Luke's Church of England School official website

Secondary schools in Devon
Schools in Exeter
Academies in Devon
Church of England secondary schools in the Diocese of Exeter

Specialist sports colleges in England
Specialist science colleges in England